The Wicked West is a graphic novel series written by Todd Livingston and Robert Tinnell and Illustrated by Neil Vokes. It is published by Image Comics. The story is set in the Weird West.

Volume 1 (October 2004) describes the events occurring in the frontier town of Javier's Tanks.

Bibliography

 The Wicked West (96 pages, October 2004)
 The Wicked West: Abomination and Other Tales (184 pages, October 2006)

See also
Deadwood (TV series)
Jonah Hex
High Moon
Strangeways (comic book)

Notes

References

External links
Official site
 The Wicked West, Newsarama, October 16, 2004
Preview: Image's The Wicked West, Comic Book Resources, October 17, 2004
Review of The Wicked West, Comics Bulletin

2004 graphic novels
2004 comics debuts
Image Comics graphic novels
Western (genre) comics